Arundinaria gigantea is a species of bamboo known as giant cane (not to be confused with Arundo donax), river cane, and giant river cane. It is endemic to the south-central and southeastern United States as far west as Oklahoma and Texas and as far north as New York. Giant river cane was economically and culturally important to indigenous people, with uses including as a vegetable and materials for construction and craft production. Arundinaria gigantea and other species of Arundinaria once grew in large colonies called canebrakes covering thousands of acres in the southeastern United States, but today these canebrakes are considered endangered ecosystems.

Description
It grows from a large network of thick rhizomes. An individual cane has a lifespan of about 10 years. Most reproduction is vegetative as the bamboo sprouts new stems from its rhizome. It rarely produces seeds and it flowers irregularly. Sometimes it flowers gregariously. Some types of non-native bamboos are confused with this native cane.

Habitat and ecology

During the last Glacial Maximum, the range of this plant was restricted to a narrow strip along the Gulf Coast. When the ice sheets retreated, it spread northward to its current range.

This native plant is a member of several plant communities today, generally occurring as a component of the understory or midstory. It grows in pine forests dominated by loblolly, slash, longleaf, and shortleaf pine, and stands of oaks, cypress, ash, and cottonwood. Other plants in the understory include inkberry (Ilex glabra), creeping blueberry (Vaccinium crassifolium), wax myrtle (Morella cerifera), blue huckleberry (Gaylussacia frondosa), pineland threeawn (Aristida stricta), cutover muhly (Muhlenbergia expansa), little bluestem (Schizachyrium scoparium), and toothache grass (Ctenium aromaticum). Cane communities occur on floodplains, bogs, riparian woods, pine barrens and savannas, and pocosins. It grows easily in flooded and saturated soils. It tolerates wildfire, and canebrakes are maintained by a normal fire regime.

Giant cane has been documented as providing food and shelter for 70 species, including six butterfly species that depend almost exclusively on it for food. An example of a butterfly that requires cane as a food plant is the southern pearly eye. Canebrakes are an important habitat for the Swainson's, hooded, and Kentucky warblers, as well as the white-eyed vireo. The disappearance of the canebrake ecosystem may have contributed to the rarity and possible extinction of the Bachman's warbler, which was dependent upon it for nesting sites. Giant cane was also one of three major sources of food for passenger pigeons, and the disappearance of canebrakes may have helped cause its extinction.

Giant cane may be prevented from growing by invasive plants like quackgrass that spread horizontally, but tall native plants such as big bluestem and ironweed have been reported to have a positive effect.

Conservation
Canebrakes declined after European settlement of the American southeast. Factors involved in the decline include the introduction of livestock such as cattle, which eagerly graze on the leaves. The cane was considered a good forage for the animals until overgrazing began to eliminate canebrake habitat. Other reasons for the decline include the conversion of the land for agriculture and fire suppression.

Uses
There are many human uses for the cane. The Cherokee, particularly the Eastern Band of Cherokee Indians, use this species in basketry. The Cherokee historically maintained canebrakes with cutting and periodic burning, a practice which stopped with the European settlement of the land. The elimination of cane habitat has nearly resulted in the loss of the art of basketmaking, which is important for the economy of the Cherokee today. The cane was also used by groups such as the Cherokee, Seminole, Chickasaw and Choctaw to make medicine, blowguns, bows and arrows, knives, spears, flutes, candles, walls for dwellings, fish traps, sleeping mats, tobacco pipes, and food.

In 2022, the Cherokee Nation signed an agreement with the National Park Service to allow collection of 76 culturally important plant species in the Buffalo River National Park in Arkansas, including A. gigantea. 

Giant cane is of interest due to its extraordinary capability to reduce both sediment loss and nitrate runoff when planted as a "buffer" between waterways and agricultural fields. A giant cane buffer zone can reduce nitrate pollution in ground water by 99%. Stands of cane are superior even to forests as protective buffers around waterways, absorbing sediment and nitrate pollution and dramatically slowing the rate at which runoff enters the stream or river.

References

Bambusoideae
Grasses of the United States
Endemic flora of the United States
Flora of the South-Central United States
Flora of the Southeastern United States
Warm-season grasses of North America
Native American ethnobotany